An advisory speed limit is a speed recommendation by a governing body, used when it may be non-obvious to the driver that the safe speed is below the legal speed. It is a posting which either approximates the Basic Speed Law or rule (and is subject to enforcement as such) or is based on a maximum g-force exerted at a specific speed. Advisory speed limits are often set in areas with many pedestrians, such as in city centres and outside schools, and on difficult stretches of roads, such as on tight corners or through roadworks. While travelling above the advisory speed limit is not illegal per se, it may be negligence per se and liability for any collisions that occur as a result of traveling above the limit can be placed partially or entirely on the person exceeding the advisory speed limit.

Signposting of advisory speed limits varies from country to country; Australia makes extensive use of advisory speed limits across its highway networks while the Richtgeschwindigkeit ("reference speed") in Germany is valid for the whole autobahn network (but can be overruled by speed limits in particular sections or for special reasons like weather conditions or roadworks), while the United States and the United Kingdom only give advisory speed limits for hazards such as bends.

Use
Use of advisory speed limits varies by locale, but they are generally used to reduce speed along short stretches of dangerous road, such as on the tight curves of an off-ramp or on a busy shopping street. The advisory speed limit when not posted is generally the same as the mandatory speed limit in ideal conditions.

Australia

In Australia, if a person is involved in a single vehicle accident and the resulting investigation reveals that the driver was exceeding the Advisory Speed Limit displayed it can be a breach of the Insurance Cover Contract, resulting in no payout.

Advisory speeds in corners are set out in AS (Australian Standard) 1742.2-2009 Manual of Uniform Traffic Control Devices, Part 2, appendix F. Corners are signed to indicate a speed at which lateral g-forces will not exceed 0.22g to fall well within the minimum suggested static rollover threshold of 0.35g for non-dangerous goods.

Germany

The Richtgeschwindigkeit (German Advisory or Suggested Speed of Travel) is a legal term in Germany describing the advisory speed limit for roads without a mandatory speed limit.

Exceeding the advised speed is not a criminal offense, but may result in greater liability in the case of a collision due to an increased danger of operating the vehicle. There are multiple court cases where another car was recklessly cutting into the left lane but partial liability was assigned to the speeding driver nevertheless (Bundesgerichtshof, 17 March 1992, VI ZR 62/91: cut in without blinking, speeding at 150–180 km/h, 25% liability; OLG Koblenz, 14 October 2013, Az. 12 U 313/13: cut in from ramp directly across two lanes, speeding at 200 km/h, 40% liability)

Until 31 August 2009, a different reference speed could be posted by the traffic signs number 380 and 381, according to §42 of the German traffic code (Straßenverkehrsordnung, StVO), as seen above. As these traffic signs were only rarely used, they have been abolished, and will be fully removed by 31 October 2022.

New Zealand
Advisory speeds are not legal speed limits. Advisory speeds end in 5 to avoid confusion with mandatory speed limits which end in 0. The limits are established at 0.22g lateral g-force to fall well within the minimum static rollover threshold of 0.35g.

United Kingdom

In the United Kingdom, most speed limits imposed by variable-message signs are advisory, and there are no sanctions for drivers who exceed them; a notable exception being the Gatsometer-camera enforced, MIDAS and ATM variable limits on motorways such as the M25, M42 and M6. Crucially, the signs imposing these limits are distinct from regular, advisory VMS displays by the inclusion of a red ring surround, effectively changing them from advance hazard warnings into standard, mandatory speed-limit signs.

As local councils require consent from the Department for Transport before changing speed limits, some use advisory speed limits on roads that the DfT refuses to officially downgrade.

Signage

The signage for advisory speed limits is not defined by the Vienna Convention on Road Signs and Signals, and is therefore not standardised internationally. The United States uses a small yellow sign under the main warning sign, as well as a standalone variation on the standard speed limit sign, with a yellow background instead of a white one, the words "speed limit" omitted and an additional panel stating the type of hazard ahead. Though they list speeds, the United States advisory speed signs are classified as warning signs, not regulatory signs, as primary speed signs are.  Australia uses a similar design as the United States in spite of regulatory speed limit signs being quite different. Germany used a square sign with a blue background and white lettering, similar to the minimum speed limit sign, and New Zealand uses a yellow background with black lettering (similar to the Australian design without the "km/h" lettering). The United Kingdom currently uses an oblong white rectangle with black lettering stating "Max Speed".

References

External links
 

Traffic law
signs
Law enforcement